Platidia is a genus of brachiopods belonging to the family Platidiidae.

The genus has almost cosmopolitan distribution.

Extant species
Platidia anomioides 
Platidia clepsydra

Extinct species
†Platidia blowi 
†Platidia marylandica

References

Brachiopod genera
Terebratulida